The Collett Baronetcy, of Bridge Ward in the City of London, is a title in the Baronetage of the United Kingdom. It was created on 1 November 1934 for Sir Charles Henry Collett, Lord Mayor of London from 1933 to 1934. Sir Christopher Collett, uncle of the third Baronet, was Lord Mayor of London in 1988.

Collett baronets, of Bridge Ward (1934)
Sir Charles Henry Collett, 1st Baronet (1864–1938)
Sir Henry Seymour Collett, 2nd Baronet (1893–1971)
Sir Ian Seymour Collett, 3rd Baronet (born 1953)

Notes

References
Kidd, Charles, Williamson, David (editors). Debrett's Peerage and Baronetage (1990 edition). New York: St Martin's Press, 1990, 

Collett